Ray William Clough, (July 23, 1920 – October 8, 2016), was Byron L. and Elvira E. Nishkian Professor of structural engineering in the department of civil engineering at the University of California, Berkeley and one of the founders of the finite element method (FEM). His article in 1956 was one of the first applications of this computational method. He coined the term “finite elements” in an article in 1960. He was born in Seattle.

In the Fall, 2008 Clough was recognized as a “Legend of Earthquake Engineering” at the World Conference of Earthquake Engineering in China. Clough was known for his work in the field of earthquake engineering, and credited with the development and application of a mathematical method, finite element analysis, that has revolutionized numerical modeling of the physical world. Dr. Clough extended the method to enable dynamic analysis of complex structures and co-authored the definitive text on structural dynamics. Three decades later, this text is still in wide use. He also transformed the field through the development of fundamental theories, computational techniques, and experimental methods. During his almost 40 years at Berkeley he taught, advised, and mentored numerous students.

Clough was professor emeritus of civil and environmental engineering at the University of California, Berkeley. He is credited with developing the Earthquake Engineering Research Center at Berkeley, a hub for analytical engineering research, information resources, and public service programs. Dr. Clough's many honors include the Prince Philip Medal from the Royal Academy of Engineering in London. He was a member of the National Academy of Sciences, the National Academy of Engineering, the Royal Norwegian Scientists Society, and the Chinese Academy of Engineering. He was awarded A. Cemal Eringen Medal in 1992. In 1994, President Clinton presented Clough with a National Medal of Science and in 2006 he received the Benjamin Franklin Medal in Civil Engineering from The Franklin Institute. He died on October 8, 2016, aged 96.

References

1920 births
2016 deaths
American structural engineers
National Medal of Science laureates
Members of the United States National Academy of Engineering
Members of the United States National Academy of Sciences
Foreign members of the Chinese Academy of Engineering
University of California, Berkeley alumni